Maclura is a genus of flowering plants in the mulberry family, Moraceae. It includes the inedible Osage orange, which is used as mosquito repellent and grown throughout the United States as a hedging plant. It is dioecious, with male and female flowers borne on separate plants.

Maclura is closely related to the genus Cudrania, and hybrids between the two genera have been produced. Some botanists recognize a more broadly defined Maclura that includes species previously included in Cudrania and other genera of Moraceae. The genus likely originated in South America during the Paleogene.

Species 
 Maclura africana (Africa)
 Maclura amboinensis (Myanmar to New Guinea)
 Maclura andamanica (Vietnam, Laos to Andaman Islands)
 Maclura brasiliensis (Brazil, Honduras, Nicaragua, Peru, and Venezuela)
 Maclura cochinchinensis (Syn.: Cudrania cochinchinensis, Cudrania javanensis, Vanieria cochinchinensis) (China, Vietnam, Malesia, N Australia)
 Maclura fruticosa (China, Vietnam)
 Maclura pomifera (Raf.) C.K.Schneid. – Osage-orange (United States)
 Maclura pubescens (Syn.: M. cochichinensis var. pubescens) (China)
 Maclura spinosa (India to Sri Lanka)
 Maclura thorellii (Syn.: Cudrania thorellii) (Cambodia, Vietnam)
 Maclura tinctoria (L.) D.Don ex Steud.
 Maclura tricuspidata (Syn.: Cudrania tricuspidata, Cudrania triloba) (China, Vietnam and Korea)

Etymology
The genus is named in honor of William Maclure (1763-1840), a Scottish-born American geologist and educational reformer. President of the American Academy of Natural Sciences of Philadelphia for 22 years. Maclure made major contributions to his field, including the first true geological map of any part of North America, and was a strong advocate of universal education, especially for women.

Formerly placed here
 Milicia excelsa (as Maclura excelsa)
 Milicia regia (as Maclura regia)
 Broussonetia greveana (as Maclura greveana and Maclura humbertii)

Fossil record
Fossils similar to Maclura have been reported from the Middle Eocene of England.

References

External links

 
Moraceae genera
Dioecious plants